Bruno Rubess (21 December 1926, Riga, Latvia – 23 December 2009) was a Latvian businessman. From his early life in the Latvian Legion (circa 1943/44) he made the transition from the turmoil in Europe to the life of a very successful businessman in Canada. Working his way up from Marketing and Sales to a Senior Executive with Volkswagen Canada and then as Senior Director for Volkswagen AG, Wolfsburg. In 1992 he was appointed to the Board of Governors of the National Bank of Latvia.

Rubess was heavily involved with the Latvian community in Toronto.

References

1926 births
2009 deaths
Businesspeople from Riga
Latvian emigrants to Canada
Latvian Waffen-SS personnel
20th-century Latvian businesspeople
20th-century Canadian businesspeople